Jorge Theriaga is a Portuguese carom billiards player. He won twice at the Three-Cushion World Cup from 1994 to 1996. Theriaga got into second place four times and third place twice at the Three-Cushion World Cup from 1995 to 1999. He got into third place three times at the CEB European Three-cushion Championship from 1986 to 1999. Theriaga was preferred as a 19-time champion in Portuguese, according to the cited Kozoom article.

References

External links 

Living people
Place of birth missing (living people)
Year of birth missing (living people)
Carom billiards players
Three-cushion billiards players
World champions in three-cushion billiards
World Cup champions in three-cushion billiards